Notikewin Provincial Park is a provincial park located in northwestern Alberta, Canada,  east of Manning.

The park is located at the confluence of the Peace River (which surrounds the park on three sides) and Notikewin River. Crummy Lake is also located in the park. At almost , it is one of the largest provincial parks in Alberta, and the northernmost to be listed as such (Wood Buffalo National Park and other wildland parks are situated further north).

Activities
The park has amenities for camping on the Peace River beach, at the Notikewin Campground, and two day-use areas, at Notikewin Hilltop and Notikewin Shore. Power boating is allowed. Recreational activities in the park include bird watching and wildlife viewing, canoeing, fishing, front country hiking.

See also
List of provincial parks in Alberta
List of Canadian provincial parks
List of National Parks of Canada

References

External links

County of Northern Lights
Provincial parks of Alberta